Thailimosina is a genus of flies belonging to the family of the Lesser Dung flies.

Species
T. maculata Papp, 2008

References

Sphaeroceridae
Sphaeroceroidea genera
Diptera of Asia